Norman Wood was a male badminton player from England.

Wood won the All England Open Badminton Championships in men's singles in 1906 and 1907.

References
All England champions 1899-2007

English male badminton players
Year of death missing
Year of birth missing